Charaxes diversiforma is a butterfly in the family Nymphalidae. It is found in the Democratic Republic of the Congo (Lomami, Lualaba, Shaba) and north-western Zambia. The habitat consists of tropical evergreen forests.

The larvae feed on Acacia amythethophylla and Amblygonocarpus andongensis.

Taxonomy
Charaxes diversiforma is a member of the Charaxes etheocles species group.

References

Van Someren, V.G.L, 1969 Revisional notes on African Charaxes (Lepidoptera: Nymphalidae). Part V. Bulletin of the British Museum (Natural History) (Entomology)75-166. page 141 plate 18 figures 157-172

External links
Charaxes diversiforma images at Consortium for the Barcode of Life
African Butterfly Database Range map via search

Butterflies described in 1957
diversiforma